Günter Asser (26 February 1926, Berlin – 23 March 2015) was a professor emeritus of logic and mathematics at the University of Greifswald. He published numerous volumes on philosophers and mathematicians. His own research was in computability theory.

In 1954, with his doctoral advisor Karl Schröter, he co-founded the journal Zeitschrift für Mathematische Logik und Grundlagen der Mathematik, which later became Mathematical Logic Quarterly. In 1977, Günter Asser became member of the German Academy of Sciences at Berlin.

See also
Spectrum of a sentence

References

External links
 Ostsee-Zeitung (German newspaper) article of 30 Mar 2015 — includes a group photograph from Greifswald University
 Publication list at DBLP

1926 births
German logicians
20th-century German mathematicians
2015 deaths
German philosophers
German male writers
Members of the German Academy of Sciences at Berlin
21st-century German mathematicians